Key to Techniques:  En = Engraver (includes Drypoint), Et = Etcher, Wo = Mezzotint, Mo = Monotype, Aq = Aquatint, Li = Lithography, We = Wood engraving, Sc = Screen-printing, St = Stipple, Di = digital.

Old master print period – c. 1800

15th century

Northern

Italian

16th century Renaissance / mannerist

Austrian

Dutch and Flemish

French

German

Italian

Swiss

17th century

British

Dutch and Flemish

French

German

Italian

Spanish

Other

18th century

British

French

German

Italian

Spanish

Other

19th century
Key to Techniques:  En = Engraver (includes Drypoint), Et = Etcher, Wo = Woodcut, Me = Mezzotint, Mo = Monotype, Aq = Aquatint, Li = Lithography, We = Wood engraving, Sc = Screen-printing, St = Stipple, Di = digital

The Americas

United States of America

Mexico

Europe

Austrian

Dutch and Belgian

British

French

German

Italian

Swiss 

Swedish

Australia 

Others

20th century, 1900 to c. 1960

The Americas

United States of America

Latin American

Europe

British

Dutch and Belgian

French

German

Greek

Swedish

Hungarian

Spanish

Italian

Other European

Australasian

Asia and Africa

Indian

Active and contemporary, from c. 1960 to present

The Americas

United States of America

Canadian

Argentina

Europe

British

Czechoslovakian

Dutch and Flemish

German

Swedish

Hungarian

Russian

Other European 

Australasian

Asia 
Indian

Other Middle East, Asia

Australia 
Australian

New Zealand

See also 
 Master printmaker

References

 
Printmakers
Printmakers